The University of Queensland Bus Station, at the University of Queensland's St Lucia Campus, is served by TransLink bus routes. It is located at Chancellor Place and is one of the primary means of accessing the university by public transport, the others being by CityCat and the UQ Lakes Bus Station. It is in Zone 1 of the TransLink integrated public transport system.

By 2012, about 2 million passengers were using the bus stop each year, making it one of the busiest bus stops in Brisbane.

See also

Public transport in Brisbane

References

Bus stations in Brisbane
University of Queensland